Ukraine - North Pole - 2000 is a Ukraine parachute expedition to the North Pole in 2000. The expedition was a success. Members of Ukraine National Parachute Team took part in it. 

Five aircraft units were involved: An-28 -1; IL-76 -1; An-26 -1.; helicopters Mi -8-2.

It consisted of two parts: a flight on the Kyiv-Khatanga-North Pole-Khatanga-Kyiv route and the landing of parachutists from the Il-76 aircraft on the drifting ice of the North Pole and the flight of the AN-28 aircraft on a similar route with a landing on the same iceberg. The AN-28 ski-chassis was successfully tested on the expedition.

References 

Military parachuting training
2000 in Ukraine